Pașcani is a commune in Criuleni District, Moldova. It is composed of two villages, Pașcani and Porumbeni.

Notable people
 Ion Mistreț

References

Communes of Criuleni District